Krivosheyevka is a rural locality (a selo) and the administrative center of Krivosheyevskoye Rural Settlement, Prokhorovsky District, Belgorod Oblast, Russia. The population was 542 as of 2010. There are 5 streets.

Geography 
Krivosheyevka is located 24 km east of Prokhorovka (the district's administrative centre) by road. Raisovka is the nearest rural locality.

References 

Rural localities in Prokhorovsky District